HMS St George was a first class cruiser of the .  She was launched on 23 June 1892.

Service history
St George took part in the 40-minute-long Anglo-Zanzibar War in 1896. The response sank Glasgow with a hole below the waterline. With a Union Jack flying over the sinking yacht in surrender, the flotilla launched lifeboats to rescue the crew of Glasgow which would lie at the bottom of Zanzibar Town Harbour until 1912.

She served in the Channel Fleet. In 1901, she was one of two escort ships for the royal yacht , which carried the Duke and Duchess of Cornwall and York (later King George V and Queen Mary) during their tour of the British Empire.

Following the end of this tour, the captain of Ophir, Commodore Alfred Winsloe, reverted to his position as Commodore commanding the Cruiser squadron, and was in late 1901 posted to St George, which thus became the lead ship of the squadron and carried his broad pennant. In May 1902 she was taken into Portsmouth for a refit. She took part in the fleet review at Spithead on 16 August 1902 for the coronation of King Edward VII, and in September that year was part of a squadron visiting Nauplia and Crete for combined manoeuvres in the Mediterranean Sea.

She was the flagship of the Cape & West Africa Station (Rear-Admiral Harry Rawson) based at Simon's Town, and served in the First World War. Sidney R. Olivier commanded the ship between 2 November 1915 and 1919.

She was designated as a depot ship in 1909, and sold for breaking up at Plymouth on 1 July 1920.

Notes

References

 Roger Chesneau and Eugene M. Kolesnik, ed., Conway's All the World's Fighting Ships 1860–1905, (Conway Maritime Press, London, 1979), 

 

Edgar-class cruisers
Ships built on the Humber
Victorian-era cruisers of the United Kingdom
World War I cruisers of the United Kingdom
1892 ships